Yves Cheminade (born 18 July 1977 in Neuchâtel), better known by the stage name Yves Larock, is a Swiss DJ and record producer. He is a member of Africanism All Stars.

Biography
His single "Rise Up", featuring vocals by Jaba, was a popular clubbing track throughout Europe and South Africa. It reached number 13 on the UK Singles Chart.

Discography

Studio albums

Singles

EPs / Other singles 
 2004 : "Aiaka" (12") (Outrage)
 2005 : "Yves Larock EP" (12" EP) (Map Dark)
 2005 : "Red Dragon" (12") (Royal Flush Records)
 2006 : "Losing Track of Time" with JD Davis (Mconvene)
 2006 : "Something on Your Mind" with Discokidz (Unlimited Sounds)
 2008 : "2008 Summer EP" (EP) (D:vision Records)
 2010 : "Don't Turn Back" (D:vision Records)
 2010 : "Respect" with Jaba (D:vision Records)
 2010 : "Girl" (Remixes) with Tony Sylla vs. Tara McDonald (X-Energy Records)
 2011 : "Milky Way" feat. Trisha (X-Energy Records)
 2011 : "Million Miles" (Promo) (Universal Music)
 2011 : "Running Man" with Jesus Luz feat. Liliana Almeida (Millia Records)
 2011 : "If You're Lonely" with Cruzaders (Millia Records)
 2011 : "The Zoo" (Millia Records)
 2011 : "Viva Las Vegas" with Tony Sylla (Ego Music)
 2011 : "Pan! Pan!" with Tony Sylla (Millia Records)
 2012 : "Friday Is Dark / Tape" (Millia Records)
 2012 : "Surrounded" with TonyT
 2013 : "A Little - Carousel" (EP) (Millia Records)
 2013 : "Needed to Know" (Millia Records)

Remixes 
 2002 : Dirty Rockerz - Let's Get Mad (Yves Larock Remix)
 2005 : Dub Deluxe - Sex on Sax (Yves Larock 'n' Yann Remix)
 2005 : Yves Cheminade (alias Yves Larock) - Vibenight (Yves Larock & Ludovic B Mix)
 2006 : Major Boys vs. Kim Wilde - Friday Night Kids (Yves Larock Remix)
 2006 : Tune Brothers - Serenata (Yves Larock 'n' Yann Remix)
 2008 : Sunchasers - The Real Thing (Yves LaRock Remix)
 2008 : JD Davis - Thrill Factor (World Cup 2008) (Yves Larock Dub Mix)
 2009 : Cruzaders featuring Terri B - One Nation (Yves Larock Remix)
 2009 : Rico Bernasconi - Hit the Dust (Yves Larock Remix)
 2009 : Subdelux - Paparazzi (Yves Larock Club Edit)
 2010 : Akcent - That's My Name (Yves Larock Radio Edit)
 2010 : Guru Josh & Igor Blaska - Eternity (Yves Larock Remix)
 2012 : House Republic - Nuggetz (Yves Larock Remix)
 2013 : NERVO & Ivan Gough ft. Beverley Knight - Not Taking This No More (Yves Larock Remix)

References

External links
 Official Artist Site
 Ministry of Sound record label page

1977 births
Swiss DJs
Swiss house musicians
Living people
Electronic dance music DJs